Basil Derek John Acres (27 November 1926 – 23 July 2000) was an English professional footballer of the 1950s, who played at full back.

A native of the village of Brantham in the Babergh district of South Suffolk, Basil Acres began his career in his home parish, before signing with Ipswich Town F.C. in July 1951. In all, he spent nine seasons at the club, finally retiring in 1960, having made 217 Football League appearances there, and scoring six goals. After the end of his football career, he remained with the club, in various working capacities, for many years.

Basil Acres died at the age of 73.

Honours
Ipswich Town
 Football League Third Division South: 1953–54, 1956–57

Individual
 Ipswich Town Hall of Fame: Inducted 2012

References 

 
 Basil Acres profile at Pride of Anglia website [restricted access]

1926 births
2000 deaths
English footballers
Ipswich Town F.C. players
English Football League players
Association football fullbacks
People from Brantham